Anderson Correia de Barros (born 6 May 1991) is a Brazilian professional footballer who plays as a left back for Cypriot First Division club Anorthosis Famagusta.

Career 
Born in São Paulo, Correia career started in Esporte Clube Santo André, competing for the Ramalhão side for only two seasons, before moving on to the larger Paulista Futebol Clube in the Campeonato Paulista in another two-year spell.

He then passed through Campeonato Gáucho, playing for Sport Club São Paulo in Rio Grande do Sul in 2014.

On 2 July 2014, Correia joined Boavista in the Portuguese league, signing a three-year deal with the Axadrezados. He made his professional debut on 17 August 2014, in a match against Braga.

Career statistics

References

External links 

1991 births
Living people
Footballers from São Paulo
Brazilian footballers
Association football defenders
Primeira Liga players
Cypriot First Division players
Esporte Clube Santo André players
Paulista Futebol Clube players
Sport Club São Paulo players
Boavista F.C. players
Nea Salamis Famagusta FC players
Brazilian expatriate footballers
Expatriate footballers in Portugal
Brazilian expatriate sportspeople in Portugal
Expatriate footballers in Cyprus
Brazilian expatriate sportspeople in Cyprus